D39 may refer to:

 Akaflieg Darmstadt D-39, a German motor glider
 D39 road (Croatia)
 , a Perth-class destroyer of the Royal Australian Navy
 , a prototype destroyer of the Royal Navy
 Queen's Gambit Declined, a chess opening
 Wilmette Public Schools District 39
 D39, an Egyptian hieroglyph
 PRR D39, a Pennsylvania Railroad 4-4-0 steam locomotive